The 2002 Liberty Bowl was a college football postseason bowl game played on December 31, 2002, at Liberty Bowl Memorial Stadium in Memphis, Tennessee. The 44th edition of the Liberty Bowl matched the TCU Horned Frogs and the Colorado State Rams. The game was sponsored by the Axa Equitable Life Insurance Company and was branded as the AXA Liberty Bowl. TCU won, 17–3; the game was TCU's 500th victory in program history.

References

Liberty Bowl
TCU Horned Frogs football bowl games
Colorado State Rams football bowl games
Liberty Bowl